Pirate Party of Russia
 Policy Planning and Research Unit (UK)
 Personnel Policy Research Unit
 Packaging and Polymer Research Unit
 Pediatric Pharmacology Research Unit (US NIH)
 PPRU-1 is a Soviet/Russian mobile air target reconnaissance and command center